Pterostylis baptistii, commonly known as the king greenhood, is a species of orchid endemic to eastern Australia. Flowering plants have a rosette of stalked, dark green leaves and a single white flower with green and brown markings, and a wide gap between the petals and lateral sepals. It occurs mostly in New South Wales but is also found in coastal Queensland and north-eastern Victoria.

Description
Pterostylis baptistii is a terrestrial, perennial, deciduous, herb with an underground tuber. Flowering plants have a rosette of between four and eight stalked, dark green leaves, each leaf 30–80 mm long and 20–25 mm wide. A single flower 40–60 mm long and 20–30 mm wide is borne on a spike 200–400 mm high. The flowers are white with green and brown markings. The dorsal sepal and petals are fused, forming a hood or "galea" over the column. The dorsal sepal curves forward with a sharp tip and is the same length as the petals.  There is a wide gap between the petals and the lateral sepals which have swept-back, thread-like tips 25–35 mm long. The sinus between the lateral sepals is almost flat with a central notch and bulges forward. The labellum is 18–22 mm long, 5–6 mm wide, reddish brown and protrudes above the sinus. Flowering mainly occurs from July to November.

Taxonomy and naming
Pterostylis baptistii was first formally described in 1875 by Robert FitzGerald from a specimen collected near Hen and Chicken Bay in Sydney. The description was published in Fitzgerald's book Australian Orchids. The specific epithet (baptistii) refers to Baptist Gardens, a nursery in Surry Hills who sent the type specimen to Fitzgerald.

Distribution and habitat
The king greenhood grows mainly in coastal areas from southern Queensland through New South Wales to north-eastern Victoria and grows in moist to wet soils on sheltered slopes in forest and near swamps.

Conservation
Pterostylis baptistii is classified as "vulnerable" under the Victorian Government Flora and Fauna Guarantee Act 1988.

References

External links 

baptistii
Endemic orchids of Australia
Orchids of New South Wales
Orchids of Queensland
Orchids of Victoria (Australia)
Plants described in 1875